Kelowna Regional Transit System is operated by FirstCanada, providing public bus transportation services in part of the central Okanagan Valley of British Columbia, Canada.
Funding for the transit system is shared between the City of Kelowna, Regional District of Central Okanagan, District of Lake Country, City of West Kelowna, Westbank First Nation and BC Transit, while the planning and routing decisions are primarily made by Kelowna City Council. 
Kelowna Regional Transit was one of the first public transit systems in Canada to have double-decker buses, and the first in Canada to have hybrid buses on regular routes. The hybrid and double deckers buses have since been relocated to Victoria.

Services

Bus routes 
There are 29 regularly scheduled routes and a BRT service called RapidBus, connecting Westbank Centre Exchange, downtown Queensway Transit Exchange and UBC Okanagan Exchange. Also, there is one route operated by Vernon Regional Transit and one route operated by South Okanagan-Similkameen Transit System within Kelowna Regional Transit's operational area.

RapidBus

97X RapidBus is rapid bus transit operated by Kelowna Regional Transit System since September 2010. RapidBus expanded its service to West Kelowna on September 2, 2012. Digital screens with real-time schedule information installed at all stops.

97x RapidBus connects West Kelowna, downtown Kelowna and UBC Okanagan via HOV lanes on Highway 97 with traffic signal priority with limited stops to provide fast and direct service.

North Okanagan Connector
90 North Okanagan Connector is an interregional route connecting UBC Okanagan and downtown Vernon. This route is operated by Vernon Regional Transit, but Kelowna Regional Transit System fare applies for travel within Kelowna Regional Transit's operational area. Kelowna Regional Transit passes and transfers are also valid between UBC Okanagan and Oyama.

Penticton
70 Penticton/Kelowna is an interregional route connecting the South Okanagan to downtown West Kelowna and Kelowna.  Northbound buses drop only in West Kelowna (no pickups), and pick up only in downtown Kelowna and West Kelowna on the southbound leg.  Fares are separate from Kelowna Regional fares.  Operated by Berry & Smith (South Okanagan contractor)

Paratransit
HandyDART is a dial-a-ride service for people with a disability that is sufficiently severe that they are unable to use regular transit buses without assistance. Clients must be pre-registered to make use of this service.

Bicycle carriers 
All buses are equipped with bicycle carriers, capable of holding two bikes at a time. Carriers cannot hold tandem or motor-powered bikes. Also, the length of handle bars must be shorter than 69 cm. Bicycles are not allowed on community shuttles before dawn or after sunset, because they would block the headlights.

Proposed changes/improvements

Potential transit routing changes

Future infrastructure
Over $50 million is being invested in Phases 2 and 3 of RapidBus in 2013 and 2014 with infrastructure being completed in West Kelowna and Kelowna.

Rutland Exchange
The Rutland Exchange is located just north of Highway 33 and between Asher and Dougall Roads. It is a small part of the grand Rutland Town Centre Plan.

Phase 1 of the exchange was completed in September 2013 and currently only the #14 Black Mountain services it. To have routes 8 and 10 service the exchange at this time would be cumbersome and unnecessary.

The future plan, pending negotiations with he Rutland Centennial Park Society, is to extend the exchange and its road, through the park to Rutland Road to allow easy left and right turns onto Rutland Road. At this time, the 8 University, 10 North Rutland, and a potential East Rutland route will be able to service it.

RapidBus stations
New stations have been constructed on Highway 97 at Gordon Drive, Richter Street, and Butt Road. They are a level-boarding design, similar to the 8 other currently existing stations. With the announcement of the six-laning of Highway 97 from Highway 33 to Edwards Road and the reconfiguration of the Old Vernon/Sexsmith Intersection, a RapidBus Station may be constructed as well as part of the design.

Westbank Exchange
The new exchange will be built on Elliott Road with saw-toothed bays as part of a larger Westbank Town Centre revitalization. This will move the exchange off of the busy Highway 97 couplet and make way for a potential elimination of the couplet altogether through the Westbank Town Centre.

Boucherie Exchange
This exchange will replace Stevens Exchange and will be located in the vicinity of Bartley Road and Highway 97. More precisely, it will be located in the field next to the Super 8 on Westgate Road, and will include a Park n' Ride facility. Eastbound buses will pull in directly off the highway (similar to the RapidBus stations in Kelowna) and Westbound buses will route along Westgate Road to a similar RapidBus station. At implementation, the select few 97 Express trips along Ross and Cameron will likely stay on Highway 97 to make for routing reliability.

Queensway Exchange
When Queensway Exchange was built in 1998, underground utilities were installed for the construction of a future building on the transit island. The vision is to build a building down the middle which can include waiting areas, a security office, and perhaps a coffee shop. The new $5.6 million Queensway transit exchange opened on April 26, 2015, and includes an all-weather wood structure above the existing transit island platform.

Fares
Kelowna Regional Transit System is operated under a single zone system within the Regional District of Central Okanagan. A transfer slip is issued upon request, which allows unlimited travel on the system for up to 90 minutes from the time of fare payment.

References

External links
 

Transit agencies in British Columbia
Transport in Kelowna
Bus rapid transit in Canada